Kells is a surname, also used as a nickname and given name.

Notable people with the name include:

Surname

 Bill Kells, New Zealand rugby league player
 Greg Kells, Canadian businessman and politician 
 Iris Kells (1923–2016), English operatic soprano
 Isabella Foster Rogers Kells, New Zealand community leader
 Morley Kells, Canadian politician
 Robert Kells (1832–1905), British soldier, recipient of the Victoria Cross
 Susannah Kells, pseudonym for Bernard and Judy Cornwell, English authors

Nickname

 Machine Gun Kelly (rapper) ("Kells" for short), Cleveland Rapper/poet
 R. Kelly, an American R&B musician, sometimes referred to as "Kells"
 Kellin Quinn, American singer, sometimes referred to as "Kells"

Given name
 Michael "Mick" John Kells Fleetwood, British musician, best known as part of Fleetwood Mac
 Ronald Allison Kells Mason, New Zealand poet

English-language surnames